At the 1964 Winter Olympics seven cross-country skiing events – four for men and three for women – were contested. The events began on January 30, 1964, in Seefeld, Austria. The women's 5 km race debuted at this Olympics.

Medal summary

Medal table

Men's events

Women's events

References

External links
Official Olympic Report

 
1964 Winter Olympics
1964 Winter Olympics events
Olympics
Cross-country skiing competitions in Austria